Honestus may refer to:

Saint Honestus, martyred at Pamplona 270 AD.
A character from The Black Arrow: A Tale of the Two Roses.

See also
Honesty
Peter de Honestis